Liability is a solo studio album by American rapper Prof. It was released via Rhymesayers Entertainment on October 16, 2015. It is Prof's first album with Rhymesayers. It features guest appearances from Tech N9ne, Petey Pablo, and Waka Flocka Flame. The album peaked at number 141 on the Billboard 200 chart, as well as number 19 on the Top R&B/Hip-Hop Albums chart.

Critical reception

David Jeffries of AllMusic gave the album 4 stars out of 5, commenting that "Guest shots from Tech N9ne ('Ghost') and Petey Pablo ('King') represent how weird and wild this guy plays it, but the local emo kids Atmosphere love the man as well, and they're likely appreciative that his brand of chaos is crafted as it comes." He added, "Liability is proof that Prof is an off-kilter but discerning MC." Jesse Sendejas Jr. of Houston Press praised the album as being like Laurence Sterne's The Life and Opinions of Tristram Shandy, Gentleman.

Track listing

Charts

References

External links
 

2015 albums
Rhymesayers Entertainment albums
Hip hop albums by American artists
Albums produced by Aesop Rock
Albums produced by Ant (producer)